Heads Hands & Feet was a British rock and country rock band. It was formed in 1969 after the breakup of Poet and the One Man Band, which included some of the same members (see Members below).

Music and performances
Heads Hands & Feet recorded their debut album, Home From Home, in 1970. Initially shelved by their label, it was finally released in 1996.

In 1971, their proper debut release, Heads Hands & Feet, was released as a single-disc record in Europe on Island Records, and as a double album in the United States on the Capitol Records label.

While still relatively unknown, they served as the supporting act for Deep Purple's series of concerts from 5 to 8 March 1971 in Glasgow, Edinburgh, Dundee, and Aberdeen, Scotland. They were the opening act at a free concert in London's Hyde Park on 3 July 1971, which also featured Humble Pie and Grand Funk Railroad.

In 1972, the band toured the United States. Their second album, Tracks, received some critical acclaim. But internal tensions in the band resulted in a break-up in December 1972, before the group's third release, Old Soldiers Never Die, in 1973.

Other activities
Ray Smith and Tony Colton teamed with producer and composer Johnny Harris on several efforts, including co-writing and co-producing for Richard Harris and Shirley Bassey, as well as writing and performing the soundtrack for the 1970 BBC documentary, The World of Georgie Best. In 1970, members of the group performed at the Royal Albert Hall with the Johnny Harris Orchestra for his 'Movements' concert, opening for Dionne Warwick.

Members of Heads Hands & Feet also provided the core backing for:
 Shirley Bassey's album Something (1970)
 Richard Harris's single "A Ballad of a Man Called Horse" (1970) 
 a still-unissued Carl Wayne album (1970)
 Jerry Lee Lewis's album The Session...Recorded in London with Great Artists, recorded in London from 7 to 11 January 1973 
 Don Everly's Sunset Towers album (1974)

Members 
Tony Colton (born Anthony George Chalk, 11 February 1942, Tunbridge Wells, Kent; died 24 August 2020) -  vocals
Pete Gavin (born Peter Leslie Rowney, 8 September 1946, Lewisham, South East London) - drums
Chas Hodges (born Charles Nicholas Hodges, 28 December 1943, Edmonton, North London; died 22 September 2018) - bass, vocals, violin
Albert Lee (born Albert William Lee, 21 December 1943, Willey, Herefordshire) - lead guitar
Mike O'Neill (born Michael O'Neill, 8 July 1938, Lowton, Lancashire; died 10 October 2013, Stevenage, Hertfordshire) - keyboards (1970-1971)
Ray Smith (born Raymond Barry Smith, 9 July 1943, London) - rhythm guitar, vocals, bass

Colton, Smith and O'Neill were previously members of the band Poet and the One Man Band.

Discography

Studio albums

References

1969 establishments in England
1973 disestablishments in England
English rock music groups
Island Records artists
Musical groups established in 1969
Musical groups disestablished in 1973